Christmas Together may refer to:

Christmas Together (Garth Brooks and Trisha Yearwood album), a 2016 album by Garth Brooks and Trisha Yearwood 
Christmas Together, a 2017 album by The Tenors
Christmas Together (The Piano Guys album), a 2017 album by The Piano Guys

See also
John Denver and the Muppets: A Christmas Together, a 1979 Christmas television special starring Jim Henson's Muppets and singer/songwriter John Denver